China National Highway 219 (G219; Chinese: Guódào219) is a highway which runs along the entire western and southern border of the People's Republic of China, from Kom-Kanas Mongolian ethnic township in Xinjiang to Dongxing in Guangxi.

Before 2013, G219 ran from Yecheng (Karghilik) in the Xinjiang Uyghur Autonomous Region to Lhatse in the Tibet Autonomous Region. This section was completed in September 1957. India disagrees with China over its  territorial footprint in Aksai Chin. During the 1962 war, China defended the road, also pushing its western frontier further west. China's 13th (2016–2020) and 14th (2021–2025) five-year plans both included development of the road and connectivity with other roads.

Former G219
Construction of this road as a gravel road was started in 1951. It is also known as the 'Yehchang–Gartok road', the 'Aksai Chin road', and the 'Sky Road'. About  passes through Aksai Chin.

Xinjiang-Tibet road, Aksai Chin 

Through 1950s China planned and constructed a road through its western frontier in Xinjiang and Tibet (Hotan/Rutog). China announced completion of the road in September 1957. A number of reasons for building the road has been conceptualized, including cementing China's control over the region. India supposedly learnt of the construction a couple of years after the road construction started. Despite the historic remoteness of the region, both sides lay claim to the area.

The road entered disputed territory "just east of Sarigh Jilgnang" after which it ran through a number of locations India recognized as its territory such as Haji Langar, and usage was claimed by India to be in contravention to the Sino-Indian Agreement 1954. The following years saw China repave the road which resulted in localized tension.  One of the reasons for the 1962 war was the defence of that road. In the defence of the road, China pushed its western frontier further west.

Dispute over the territory persists to the present time. There is a Chinese war memorial on the G219 at Kangxiwar. A number of lateral roads have been constructed with scattered military infrastructure.

Road development 
Repaving of the road began in late 2010. This was the first repaving since the 1960s, according to a Chinese road administration official. The 13th five-year plan of China (2016–2020) further upgraded the road. In 2013 the road was upgraded to asphalt. A number of provincial roads have been and are being developed which exit off from the G219, the G564 and the G365, and the S205, S206, S207. China 14th five-year plan for 2021–2025 further improves connectivity with G219.

Route description 

As one of the highest motorable roads in the world, the breathtaking scenery of Rutog County also ranks as some of the most inhospitable terrain on the planet. Domar township—a town of concrete blocks and nomad tents—is one of the bleakest and most remote outposts of the People's Liberation Army at the edge of the Aksai Chin. Near the town of Mazar many trekkers turn off for both the Karakorum range and K2 base camp. Approaching the Xinjiang border, past the final Tibetan settlement of Tserang Daban is a dangerous 5,050-meter-high pass. Tibetan nomads in the area herd both yaks and two-humped camels. Descending through the western Kunlun Shan, the road crosses additional passes of 4,000 and 3,000 meters, and the final pass offers brilliant views of the Taklamakan Desert far below before descending into the Karakax River basin.

The Chinese government is making efforts to promote tourism along G219. There are a number of military check posts along the road.

Route and distance

Mountain Passes Rhyme 

The western portion of the highway has numerous notable mountain passes. Motorists have invented a rhyme describing those mountain passes:

Gallery

New route
The route was expanded in the China National Highway Network Planning (2013–2030) both northward and eastward to span the entire Chinese western and southern border.

The section along the China-Vietnam border is also known as the Yanbian Highway (沿边公路, literally: along the border highway).

Route table

See also 
 China National Highways
 China National Highway 228, which follows the coastline of China
China National Highway 331, which follows the northern border of China

References

Further reading 
 Dorje, Gyurme. (2009). Footprint Tibet Handbook. (4th Ed.) Footprint Handbooks, Bath, England. .

External links 
 
 
 Xinjiang-Tibet Highway (Yecheng-Burang)
 The Highway 219 from Yecheng over Western Tibet to Kathmandu Description and profile of the route.
 From Kashgar to Lhassa Photos along highway 219 (text in French).
 Some photos along the Highway 219
 A detailed description of a bicycle ride along highway 219 with many photos
Photographs of a 2018 trip along G219

219
Roads in Xinjiang
Roads in Tibet